Killer Films is a New York City-based independent film production company founded by movie producers Christine Vachon and Pamela Koffler in 1995. The company has produced a number of the most acclaimed American independent films over the past two decades including Far From Heaven (nominated for four Academy Awards), Boys Don't Cry (Academy Award winner), One Hour Photo, Kids, Hedwig and the Angry Inch, Happiness, Velvet Goldmine, Safe, I Shot Andy Warhol, Swoon, I'm Not There (Academy Award nominated), Kill Your Darlings, Still Alice (Academy Award winner) and Carol (nominated for six Academy Awards). Killer Films executive produced Todd Haynes' five episode HBO miniseries Mildred Pierce featuring Kate Winslet and Guy Pearce, which went on to win five Emmys, a Golden Globe and a Screen Actors Guild Award.

In 2014, Killer Films merged with Glass Elevator Media to form Killer Content, Inc.

Awards and recognition
Killer Films productions have received multiple awards and nominations from the Academy of Motion Picture Arts & Sciences, the Emmy Awards, the Hollywood Foreign Press Association and the Independent Spirit Awards. On the occasion of Killer's 10th anniversary in 2005, the company was feted with a retrospective at the Museum of Modern Art.

Christine Vachon's first feature production, Poison, directed by Todd Haynes, won the Grand Jury Prize at the 1991 Sundance Film Festival. Poison was one of the defining films of the emerging New Queer Cinema. For her work on Far From Heaven, another Todd Haynes collaboration, Vachon was honored by the New York Film Critics Circle, and received the Producer of the Year Award from the National Board of Review.

Vachon produced the Showtime television adaptation of the public broadcasting radio program, This American Life, for which she won an Emmy. In 2011, Christine was invited to give the State of Cinema Address at the San Francisco Film Society's 54th San Francisco International Film Festival.

Vachon has also written two books on her life and career, Shooting to Kill (1998), and A Killer Life (2006).

One of Killer's most recent films, Kill Your Darlings, directed by John Krokidas, and starred Daniel Radcliffe and Dane DeHaan, was selected for the Sundance Film Festival and went on to be nominated for the Grand Jury Prize. After producing Magic Magic, which debuted at the 2013 Sundance Film Festival to wide acclaim, Killer re-teamed with writer-director Sebastián Silva on his new feature, Nasty Baby.

In 2015, Julianne Moore won the Best Performance by an Actress Oscar for her part in the 2014 Killer film Still Alice, directed by Wash Westmoreland and Richard Glatzer, based on the novel of the same name, written by Lisa Genova.  That same year, Killer re-teamed with director Todd Haynes on Carol, based on the 1952 romance novel, The Price of Salt, written by Patricia Highsmith. The film stars Cate Blanchett and Rooney Mara.

In 2017, the company produced Janicza Bravo's Lemon starring Brett Gelman and Judy Greer; Beatriz at Dinner starring Salma Hayek and Chloë Sevigny; and Dina directed by Dan Sickles & Antonio Santini, the latter of three winning the Documentary Grand Jury Prize at the 2017 Sundance Film Festival.

In May 2017, the company signed a two-year first look deal with Amazon Studios.

Filmography

Film

Television

See also
New Queer Cinema

Further reading
 Vachon, Christine. Shooting to Kill: How an Independent Producer Blasts Through the Barriers to Make Movies that Matter,  Avon Books, 335 p., 1st ed., 1998, .
 Vachon, Christine. A Killer Life: How an Independent Film Producer Survives Deals and Disasters in Hollywood and Beyond, Simon & Schuster, 279 p., 1st ed., 2006, .

References

External links
 Killer Films website
 Christine Vachon (February 24, 2017).   Film-makers can defy Trump. Depicting the lives of others is an act of resistance. The Guardian

Film production companies of the United States
Companies based in New York City
Mass media companies established in 1995
American independent film studios